Lena in Hollywood is a 1966 studio album by Lena Horne, arranged by Ray Ellis.

Track listing
 "Singin' in the Rain" (Nacio Herb Brown, Arthur Freed) – 2:51
 "In Love in Vain" (Jerome Kern, Leo Robin) – 2:30
 "Never on Sunday" (Manos Hadjidakis, Billy Towne) – 4:07
 "Somewhere" (Leonard Bernstein, Stephen Sondheim) – 2:25
 "All the Way" (Sammy Cahn, Jimmy Van Heusen) – 3:01
 "Wives and Lovers" (Burt Bacharach, Hal David) – 2:11
 "It Had Better Be Tonight" (Henry Mancini, Johnny Mercer, Franco Migliacci) – 2:17
 "Moon River" (Mancini, Mercer) – 3:27
 "A Fine Romance" (Dorothy Fields, Kern) – 2:56
 "I Love Paris" (Cole Porter) – 3:26
 "It's a Mad, Mad, Mad, Mad World" (Mack David, Ernest Gold) – 1:55

Personnel

Performance
Lena Horne – vocals
Ray Ellis – arranger

References

Lena Horne albums
United Artists Records albums
Albums arranged by Ray Ellis
1966 albums
Albums produced by Ray Ellis